Uglovsky District is the name of several administrative and municipal districts in Russia.

Districts of the federal subjects

Uglovsky District, Altai Krai, an administrative and municipal district of Altai Krai

Historical districts
Uglovsky District, Leningrad Oblast (1927–1932), a district of Leningrad Oblast

See also
Uglovsky (disambiguation)

References